Sporobolus hookerianus is a species of grass known by the common name alkali cordgrass.

Distribution
It is native to western North America from north-western Canada through the western United States and eastern California, and into central Mexico. It grows in moist alkaline habitat, such as evaporating streams and shorelines, alkali flats, and inland marshes.

Description
It is a perennial grass growing from short rhizomes. It produces usually single, slender stems reaching a meter in maximum height. The leaves are flat and ridged, and may roll in when new. The inflorescence is a narrow, dense, spike-like stick of branches appressed together, the unit reaching up to 25 centimeters long. The branches are lined with spikelets.

References

External links
Jepson Manual Treatment
USDA Plants Profile
Grass Manual Treatment
Photo gallery

hookerianus
Grasses of the United States
Grasses of Canada
Native grasses of California
Grasses of Mexico
Flora of the California desert regions
Flora of Canada